Coacoatzintla in Veracruz, Mexico. It is located in the mountainous central zone of the State of Veracruz, about 11.5 km from state capital Xalapa. It has a surface of 51.00 km2.

The municipality of Coacoatzintla is delimited to the north by Tonayan, to the north-east by Miahuatlán, to the east by Naolinco, to the south-east by Jilotepec, to the south by Banderilla and to the west by Tlacolulan.

It produces principally maize and potatoes.

The celebration in honor to Santiago Apostol, patron of the town, occurs in July.

The climate in Coacoatzintla is wet and cold with rains all year round.

References

External links 

  Municipal Official webpage
  Municipal Official Information

Municipalities of Veracruz